Gloria Muzio is an American theatre and television director. She has worked on a number of TV shows including Criminal Minds, Brothers & Sisters, The Black Donnellys, The Closer, ER, Third Watch, Law & Order, Law & Order: Criminal Intent, Law & Order: Special Victims Unit, The Wire and Oz.

Filmography
Deception
"You're the Bad Guy" (2013)
The Good Wife
"Crash" (2009)
Brothers & Sisters
"An American Family" (2007)
"The Other Walker" (2007)
Criminal Minds
"Doubt" (2007)
"The Big Game" (2007)
"The Last Word" (2006)
"The Fisher King: Part 2" (2006)
"A Real Rain" (2006)
Saving Grace
"And You Wonder Why I Lie" (2007)
The Black Donnellys
"Lies" (2007)
Ghost Whisperer
"Deja Boo" (2007)
"Weight of What Was" (2007)
"Deadbeat Dads" (2008)
"Save Our Souls" (2008)
"Thrilled To Death" (2009)
"Till Death Do Us Start" (2009)
"Dead Air" (2010)
The Closer
"Mom Duty" (2006)
"Fatal Retraction" (2005)
"LA Woman" (2005)
"You Are Here" (2005)
"Fantasy Date" (2005)
Huff
"Bethless" (2006)
E-Ring
"War Crimes" (2006)
ER
"I Do" (2005)
"Refusal of Care" (2005)
House M.D.
"Hunting" (2005)
Third Watch
"End of Tour" (2005)
"Higher Calling" (2004)
"A Ticket Grows in Brooklyn" (2003)
CSI: Miami
"Identity" (2005)
Hawaii (2004)
Law & Order
"Hands Free" (2004)
"City Hall" (2004)
"Maritime" (2003)
"Under God" (2003)
"Maritime" (1998)
Joan of Arcadia (2003)
Platinum
"Power" (2003)
The Dead Zone
"Dead Men Tell No Tales" (2003)
Ed
"May the Best Man Win" (2002)
"The Shot" (2002)
Presidio Med
"Pelagros" (2002)
Law & Order: Criminal Intent
"Best Defense" (2002)
"Semi-Professional" (2002)
"Poison" (2002)
The Wire
Episode 1.08 "Lessons" (2002)
Law & Order: Special Victims Unit
"Care" (2001)
Oz
"Orpheus Descending" (2001)
Son of the Beach
"Miso Honei" (2000)

References

External links
 

American television directors
American theatre directors
American women television directors
Living people
Place of birth missing (living people)
Year of birth missing (living people)
Women theatre directors